Chandrapur (earlier known as Chanda, the official name until 1964) is a city and a municipal corporation in Chandrapur district, Maharashtra state, India. It is the district headquarters of Chandrapur district. Chandrapur is a fort city founded by Khandkya Ballal Sah, a Gond king of the 13th century. The city sits at the confluence of the Erai river and Zarpat river. The area around the city is rich in coal seams.. Hence, Chandrapur is also known as the "Black Gold City".

Etymology
The local people relate the name "Chandrapur" to the words Chandra (the moon) and pur (a settlement) after a legend. Scholars see the name as a derivative of "Indupur" (city of the moon) which stood near the Jharpat in the Treta Yuga.

History
There are many Stone Age sites in Chandrapur District. Suresh Chopane, a renowned researcher, found many stone-age tools in the district, which has been displayed in his Rock Museum. Archeological finds, such as signs of pottery making, suggest inhabitation of the Chandrapur area in Neolithic times.

From ancient times, Chandrapur has fallen under the control of many different rulers. Between 322 BCE and 187 BCE, much of India, including Maharashtra, was part of the Maurya Empire. From 187 BCE to 78 BCE, Chandrapur was part of the Shunga Empire which controlled much of central and eastern India. The Satavahana Empire controlled Chandrapur from the 1st century BCE to the 2nd century CE. The Vakataka dynasty ruled from the area from the mid 3rd century CE to 550 CE. The Kalachuri dynasty ruled in the area in the 6th and 7th centuries CE. The Rashtrakuta dynasty followed, controlling the Chandrapur region between the 7th and 10th centuries. The Chalukya dynasty ruled in the region to the 12th century CE. The Seuna (Yadava) dynasty of Devagiri ruled a kingdom, including the Chandrapur area, in approximately 850 CE and continued until 1334 CE.

The Gond people are part of the Adivasi (indigenous people) of India. In ancient times, the Gond diaspora spread throughout central India. After the passage of many kings, who were largely subservient to other rulers, the Gond king, Khandkya Ballal (1470  1495) came to the throne. He founded Chandrapur.

As per legends, Khandkya, who resided in Sirpur, was covered in tumours. His wise and beautiful wife nursed him. She asked him to leave Sirpur and move to the north bank of the Wardha River. There, the king built a fort he named "Ballalpur" and thus founded the city of Ballarpur. One day, while hunting northwest of Ballalpur, the king became thirsty and rode up to the dry bed of the Jharpat river in search of water. He discovered water trickling from a hole, and after drinking, washed his face, hands and feet. That night, he slept soundly for the first time in his life.

On his return, the queen was delighted to see that many of the tumours on her husband's body had disappeared. The king said it was the water that had cured him and took his wife to see the water hole. On clearing the grass and sand, they found five footprints of a cow in the solid rock, each filled with water. The water source at the spot was inexhaustible and considered holy. The place was called "Tirtha of Acalesvar of the Treta Yuga". When the king bathed in the water, all the tumours on his body vanished. That night at the water hole, Acalesvar appeared to the king in a dream and spoke comforting words. A temple was built over the water hole.

One morning, at the water hole, the king saw a hare darting out of a bush and chasing his dog. Eventually, the dog killed the hare. The king found a white spot on the forehead of the hare. The queen said it was a good omen and a fortified city should be built with its layout based on the chase of the dog and hare. She said the place where the hare was killed would be unlucky for the city. The king's officers, the "Tel Thakurs" built the fortified city. The city became Chandrapur.

Gond rule was lost in 1751 to the Maratha period. The last ruler of the Maratha dynasty, Raghuji Bhonsle III died in 1853 without issue. In 1853, Chandrapur was annexed to British India. During the British colonial period, the area of Chandrapur was called "Chanda". By 1871, Anglican and Scottish Episcopal missionaries had arrived in the city. In 1874, three tehsils were created: Viz Mul, Warora and Bramhpuri. The upper Godavai district of Madras was abolished and four tehsils were added to Chandrapur to form one tehsil with Sironcha, approximately 150 km to the south, as its centre of governance. In 1895, the headquarters was transferred to Chandrapur. In 1905, a new tehsil with headquarters at Gadchiroli was created through the transfer of zamindari estates from Bramhpuri and Chandrapur tehsil. In 1907, a small area of land was transferred from Chandrapur to the newer districts and another area of about 1560 km2, comprising three divisions of the lower Sironcha tehsil (Cherla, Albak and Nugir) were transferred to Madras State. Between 1911 and 1955, no major changes occurred in the boundaries of the district or its tehsils.

In 1956, with the reorganization of Indian states, Chandrapur district was transferred from Madhya Pradesh to Bombay state. In 1959, part of Adilabad district of Hyderabad state, was transferred to Chandrapur district. In May 1960, Chandrapur district became part of the Maharashtra state. In 1964, the city was renamed to Chandrapur. Following the 1981 Census of India, Chandrapur district was divided into Chandrapur district and Gadchiroli district.

Geography
Chandrapur is located in central India in the eastern part of Maharashtra state at 19.57°N latitude and 79.18°E longitude. Chandrapur is situated at 189.90 meters above the mean sea level. The area of the city is about 162.41 km2. The north–south length of the city is about 15.90 km, while the east–west length is about 10.90 km. The city slopes from the north to the south.

Chandrapur lies at the confluence of the Erai and Zarpat rivers. The Erai river has a history of flooding. Flood marks are seen on the walls of the city. In the north of the city, a dam is constructed on the river Erai, having the capacity of 207 million cubic meters. The Gaontideo Nala originates from the uplands of the Chandrapur Super Thermal Power Station. The Macchhi Nala originates from uplands of Central Forest Rangers College.

Chandrapur lies on terrain rich in coal. Chandrapur is called a "geological museum" as there is a large variety of rocks as well as commercially valuable minerals and fossils. Samples of such rocks are collected at the Suresh Chopane Rock Museum.

Climate
Chandrapur has a hot and dry climate. December is the coldest month, with a minimum average temperature of 9 °C and a maximum average temperature of 23.2 °C. May is the hottest month with a mean maximum temperature of 43 °C and a mean minimum temperature of 28.2 °C. On 2 June 2007, there was the highest recorded temperature of 49 °C.[In January 1899 & 2021] , there was the lowest recorded temperature of 2.8 °C.

The monsoon season comes between June and September. Chandrapur's average annual rainfall is 1249.4 mm. The average number of rainy days is 59.2.

Demographics
Per the 2011 census of India, Chandrapur's population was 375,000.

Languages
Marathi is spoken by majority of the people in Chandrapur. The native Gondi is spoken by most of the Gonds in Chandrapur. People can also speak Hindi and English.

Akhil Bharatiya Marathi Sahitya Sammelan, the conference on Marathi literature, has been held twice in Chandrapur, in 1979 (Chair Vaman Krushna Chorghade) and in 2012 (Chair Vasant Aabaji Dahake).

In 2016, the inaugural All India Gondi Religious Convention was convened by the Central Provinces and Berar Gondwana Samaj Sewa Samiti in Warora, 30 km north west of Chandrapur. The Chair was Raja Virshah Krushnashah Atram, a descendant of Khandkya Ballal Sah and current titular Gond king of Chandrapur.

Religion

According to the 2012 India census, 71.84 percent of people in Chandrapur are Hindu, 15.64 percent are Buddhist, 10.07 percent are Muslims, 0.94 percent are Christians, 0.54 percent follow Jainism, 0.44 percent are Sikhs, 0.47 percent follow other religions and 0.05 percent identify with no particular religion.

Transport
Chandrapur lies on major state highways MH MSH 6, MH MSH 9 and state highways MH SH 233, MH SH 243 and MH SH 264. Chandrapur is connected to many cities in Maharashtra by the Maharashtra State Road Transport Corporation bus service. Bus services are offered to Pune, Nagpur, Amravati, Yavatmal, Hyderabad, and Raipur. A proposed Chandrapur Pune expressway, via Yavatmal Beed, is in the planning stages.

Chandrapur railway station is managed by the Nagpur CR railway division of the Central Railway. It lies on the New Delhi–Chennai main line. The Chanda Fort railway station is managed by the Nagpur SEC railway division of the South East Central Railway. It lies on the Balharshah–Gondia line. Other railway stations within city limits are Vivekanand Nagar railway station, Babupeth railway station and Choti Padoli railway station.

Chandrapur Airport, operated by the Maharashtra Airport Development Company, is situated near Morwa on MH SH 264, about 12 km from the city. The airstrip is 950 m in length. Development of the airport is limited by surrounding obstructions, particularly the thermal power plant. Hence, the MADC is building a greenfield airport at Vihirgaon, 40 kilometres from Chandrapur. The nearest airport with scheduled flights is the Dr. Babasaheb Ambedkar International Airport in Nagpur.

Economy
Chandrapur is a centre for coal mining. In 2012, there were 27 coal mines around Chandrapur.

Other industries include cement making, paper manufacturing, and ferro alloy manufacturing.

Chandrapur Super Thermal Power Station
It employs approximately 3,460 people and supplies more than 25 percent of the state's electricity. A masonry dam on the Erai river, 15 km from the station provides water to the station and to Chandrapur. On 16 January 1977, the station's foundation stone was laid by the Central Energy Minister, K. C. Pant.

Education
The Karmavir Dadasaheb Kannamwar High School (previously known as the Zilha Parishad Jubilee High School) was established in 1906. The Lokmanya Tilak Vidyalaya was founded by Bal Gangadhar Tilak. The Chanda Sikshan Prasarak Mandal is a large educational institution with a number of campuses in Chandrapur.

Professional
Chandrapur has a government medical college and a government engineering college. The city's colleges (apart from the medical college) are affiliated with Gondwana University.

Administration
On 20 October 2011, Chandrapur municipal council was elevated to a D-grade municipal corporation.

Important places

Chandrapur Fort
The Chandrapur Fort (earlier known as Chanda Fort) (today called "old city") is a fort located at confluence of Erai and Zarpat rivers. The fort was built by Gond king, Khandkya Ballal Sah. The fort has four gates: Jatpura Gate to the north, Anchaleshwar Gate to the east, Pathanpura Gate to the south and Binba Gate to the west. The fort also has Five small gates, called khidkis (windows): Bagad Khidki to the northeast, Hanuman Khidki to the southeast, Vithhal Khidki to the southwest and Chor Khidki to the northwest and Masan Kidki. The fort has strong walls 15–20 feet high.

Mahakali Mandir

Mahakali Mandir (temple) is an often frequented temple in Chandrapur. The ancient temple was built by Dhundya Ram Sah, of Gond Dynasty around the 16th century. Tuesdays are a particularly significant day to visit. Within the mandir there is a small Ganesh temple and a Hanuman temple. At the two temple entrances, there are small shops for puja (worship) supplies such as coconut, flowers and cloth. Items for home décor and puja décor are sold near the temple. Near the rear entrance there is a Shani temple.

Within the temple are two murtis (idols). One associated with Shiv Ling is a standing idol decorated with red, yellow and orange cloths. The other is in a reclining position below the ground level, and devotees must walk in a tunnel to reach it. Inside the temple, a priest is present to assist visitors with puja and offerings. A trust administers the temple. Dharmashalas provide accommodation for pilgrims. The annual yatra (fair) takes place in April, entertaining the followers of Mahakali and the citizens of Chandrapur.

Anchaleshwar Mandir

The Anchaleshwar Mandir celebrates a form of the Lord Siva. It is situated adjoining Anchaleshwar Gate of Chandrapur fort on the banks of the Zarpat river. The official samadhi (mausoleum) of the Gond kings is located within the temple complex.

Tadoba Andhari Tiger Reserve

The Tadoba Andhari Tiger Reserve is located approximately 30 km north of Chandrapur near the Erai dam. This park was included in the project tiger since 1973. The total area of the reserve is 625.40 km2. In 2014 the tiger population in Tadoba was 66, that number has gone up to 86. Tadoba is now a home to 86 Tigers despite years of lynching, poaching & other threats. There are many hotels and resorts near Moharli gate, Zari gate and Navegaon gate of the reserve, available for the tourists. The guided tours inside the park are available during early morning and evening time only.

Notable people

 Karmavir Dadasaheb Kannamwar, second Chief Minister of Maharashtra.
 Mohan Bhagwat, chief of the Rashtriya Swayamsewak Sangh.
 Hansraj Ahir, former Deputy Home Minister Of India (MOS Home affairs) and also Union minister of Chemical and Fetilizers (MOS) Govt. of  India.
 Shantaram Potdukhe, former Minister of State (Finance) of India.
 Barrister Rajabhau Khobragade, Deputy Chairman of Rajya Sabha, leader of the Republican Party of India (Khobragade) and follower of B. R. Ambedkar.
 Balasaheb Deshmukh, a follower of Bal Gangadhar Tilak. It was due to his efforts that Tilak visited Chandrapur and laid the foundation of Lokmanya Tilak Vidyalaya.
 Abdul Shafee, a politician of the Indian National Congress Party, MLC, 5th Loksabha.
 Sudhir Mungantiwar, former Minister of Finance & Planning and Forests Govt.of Maharastra, former Guardian Minister of Wardha and Chandrapur.
 Swagat Thorat, a wildlife photographer, playwright, painter, editor, and director. Known as the Braille Man of India.

See also
 Make In Maharashtra
 Urjanagar

References

External links

 Official website of Chandrapur district

 
Cities in Maharashtra
Talukas in Maharashtra